Bhai Lal was an Indian politician. He stood for the 2007 by-elections  on the BSP ticket becoming the Member of Parliament from Robertganj.

From 2012 to 2017 and 1996 until 2002 he was a member of the  Uttar Pradesh Assembly, representing Chhanbey.

References

1953 births
2020 deaths
India MPs 2004–2009
Uttar Pradesh MLAs 2012–2017
Samajwadi Party politicians
People from Sonbhadra district
Deaths from the COVID-19 pandemic in India
Samajwadi Party politicians from Uttar Pradesh